The Victoria Police Museum is a law enforcement museum operated by the Historical Services Unit within the Media and Corporate Communications Department of Victoria Police. It is open to the public and is located in the mezzanine of the WTC Wharf building in the city of Melbourne, Australia.

The museum's collection includes relics and artefacts from over 150 years of crime and policing in the state of Victoria, including a forensic evidence brief used to convict Julian Knight of the Hoddle Street massacre, wreckage from the Russell Street bombing of police headquarters, and the death mask of executed murderer Frederick Deeming.

The museum held the backplate of the armour of the bushranger Ned Kelly, until 2002 when it donated the piece to the State Library of Victoria to make a complete set of Kelly's armour along with other pieces from Melbourne Museum and Scienceworks. In addition, historian Ken Oldis identified some items misidentified as Kelly's which actually belonged to other members of his gang. The museum holds Australia's largest collection of Kelly Gang armour, including the sets of armour worn by gang members Dan Kelly and Steve Hart.

References

External links
Victoria Police Museum website

Museums in Melbourne
Law enforcement museums in Australia
Victoria Police
Buildings and structures in the City of Melbourne (LGA)